The 1968–69 Minnesota Pipers season was the only season of the Pipers in Minnesota and second overall season in the American Basketball Association. The previous season, the Pipers had won the ABA Finals, but moved the team from Pittsburgh to Minnesota (which had just lost the Muskies) after the season. But the Pipers were not any more successful in Minnesota, and they moved back to Pittsburgh before next season. The team went through three coaches: Harding, who was fired after attacking the Pipers Chairman Gabe Rubin at the banquet of the All-Star Game. Mikkelsen (the general manager) took over for a while before Verl Young took the job permanently. Hawkins, Williams, Vaughn, and Heyman were nagged by injuries due to long practices, which affected the team, which fell in the Semifinals to the Miami Floridians. Minnesota would not have a pro basketball team again until 1989 with the Minnesota Timberwolves.

Roster
 25 Dan Anderson - Center
 35 Frank Card - Small forward	
 30 Steve Chubin - Shooting guard	
 42 Connie Hawkins - Power forward	
 12 Art Heyman - Small forward	
 41 Tom Hoover - Center	
 45 Tony Jackson - Forward / Guard	
 20 Jim Jarvis - Point guard	
 14 Arvesta Kelly - Shooting guard	
 13 Jim Kissane - Forward	
 23/41 Tom Kondla - Center	
 24 Mike Lewis - Center	
 30 Willie Porter - Power forward	
 15 George Sutor - Center	
 22 Steve Vacendak - Point guard	
 10 Chico Vaughn - Shooting guard	
 32 Trooper Washington - Center	
 12 Ken Wilburn - Small forward		
 44 Charlie Williams - Point guard	
 13/24 Leroy Wright - Power forward

Final standings

Eastern Division

Playoffs
Eastern Division Semifinals vs. Miami Floridians

Pipers lose series, 4–3

Awards and honors
1969 ABA All-Star Game selections (game played on January 28, 1969)
 Trooper Washington
 Charlie Williams
Hawkins had been selected, but he was injured.
Harding was selected to coach the team, but Rhodes replaced him after his firing.

References

 Pipers on Basketball Reference

External links
 RememberTheABA.com 1968-69 regular season and playoff results
 Pipers page

Pittsburgh Condors seasons
Minnesota
Minnesota Pipers, 1968-69
Minnesota Pipers, 1968-69